Robert Abramovič (born 15 September 1988) is a Slovenian professional basketball player.

External links
 PepiSport Profile
 BalkanLeague Profile
 Eurobasket Profile
 RealGM Profile

References

1988 births
Living people
Point guards
Slovenian men's basketball players
Basketball players from Ljubljana
KK Zabok players
KK Teodo Tivat players
KB Peja players